The Southwest Conference (SWC) was an NCAA Division I college athletic conference in the United States that existed from 1914 to 1996. Composed primarily of schools from Texas, at various times the conference included schools from Oklahoma and Arkansas.

For most of its history, the core members of the conference were Texas-based schools plus one in Arkansas: Baylor University, Rice University, Southern Methodist University, Texas A&M University, Texas Christian University, Texas Tech University, the University of Arkansas and the University of Texas at Austin. After a long period of stability, the conference's overall athletic prowess began to decline throughout the 1980s, due in part to numerous member schools violating NCAA recruiting rules, culminating in the suspension of the entire SMU football program ("death penalty") for the 1987 and 1988 seasons. Arkansas, after years of feeling like an outsider in the conference, left after the 1990–91 school year to join the Southeastern Conference, although they did compete in the SWC in football for the 1991 season. Five years later, the conference precipitously broke up as Baylor, Texas, Texas A&M, and Texas Tech (which had entered in 1956) combined with the members of the former Big Eight Conference to form a new league, the Big 12 Conference, while Rice, SMU, TCU, and Houston (which entered the SWC in 1976) found homes in less prominent conferences (although TCU has since been added to the Big 12, and Houston will join the league in 2023).

History

Early years
L. Theo Bellmont, the University of Texas athletic director, sent out questionnaires to schools in Texas and neighboring states to gauge their interest in organizing an athletic conference. By March 1, 1914, a number of schools had responded favorably to the idea.

The first organizational meeting of the conference was set for April 30, 1914; since not all schools involved could send representatives to attend that date, it was ultimately held on May 5 and 7 at the Oriental Hotel in Dallas, Texas. It was chaired by Bellmont, who originally wanted Louisiana State University and the University of Mississippi to join the conference as well, but they declined to do so. The Southwest Intercollegiate Athletic Conference became an official body on December 8 at a formal meeting at the Rice Hotel in Houston.

Its early years saw fluctuation in membership; Southwestern (a comparatively smaller school) dropped out of the conference in 1916, and Southern Methodist University (SMU) joined in 1918, while Texas Christian University (TCU) became a member in 1923. Rice University left the conference in 1916, only to rejoin in 1918.

Phillips University was a conference member for one year (1920). Oklahoma left in 1919 to join the Missouri Valley Intercollegiate Athletic Association (later known as the Big Eight Conference), and was followed by Oklahoma A&M in 1925. However, the series between Texas and Oklahoma would continue as a non-conference matchup in the annual Red River Rivalry game held in Dallas. From 1925 until 1991, the University of Arkansas would be the only conference member not located within the state of Texas.

Prime years
By 1925, the conference's name was shortened to simply Southwest Conference.  After its organizational years, the conference settled into regularly scheduled meetings among its members, and began to gain stature nationwide. The SWC would be guided by seven commissioners, the first of whom, P. W. St. Clair, was appointed in 1938. In 1940, the conference took control of the then five-year-old Cotton Bowl Classic, which further established the prestige of both the bowl and the conference. Texas Technological College (now Texas Tech University) joined the SWC in 1958, followed by the University of Houston for the 1976 season (Houston won the SWC football championship in its first season in the league).

The two glory periods of the conference were in the 1930s and 1960s. In 1935, the last year before the AP Poll, both TCU and SMU claimed the national title. The 2 teams had played in one of the first games labeled "game of the century" on November 30 of that year. In 1938, TCU won the AP national title. In 1939, the SWC made it back to back national titles when Texas A&M won the AP Poll. In the 1960s, the SWC was dominated by two teams, Texas and Arkansas. Texas won the 1963 national championship, and Arkansas won a national championship in 1964 in the Football Writers Association of America (FWAA) and Helms Athletic Foundation (HAF) polls. In 1969, Texas won another national championship by beating #2-ranked Arkansas 15–14 in the regular season's final game (dubbed the "Big Shootout"). The 1969 Arkansas–Texas game in Fayetteville, Arkansas, attended by President Richard Nixon, is usually counted among the greatest college football games ever played.  Texas also won the 1970 United Press International (UPI) National Championship (i.e., the coaches' poll), which until 1974 was awarded prior to the bowl games. Texas lost the Cotton Bowl Classic following the 1970 season to Notre Dame by a score of 24–11, giving the Associated Press (AP) Championship to Nebraska after they beat LSU by a score of 17–12 in the Orange Bowl.

Since its first Cotton Bowl Classic and lasting until 1995, the Southwest Conference Champion automatically received an invitation as the "host" team in the Cotton Bowl Classic game on New Year's Day in Dallas. Opponents usually were the runners-up from the Big Eight Conference or the Southeastern Conference, although independents Penn State and Notre Dame were also often featured. From the 1940s onward, the Cotton Bowl Classic was counted among the four major bowl games, and often had national championship implications. However, in the 1990s, the game declined in importance, largely because of the decline of SWC prominence. In 1977, Notre Dame became the last team to win a national championship in the Cotton Bowl Classic by beating Texas in the January 1978 game.

The SWC had many legendary players and coaches over the years. In football, John Heisman, Dana X. Bible, Paul "Bear" Bryant, Darrell Royal, Frank Broyles, Hayden Fry, Lou Holtz, Bill Yeoman, Gene Stallings, and Grant Teaff all served as head coaches in the conference. Some notable SWC players included Davey O'Brien, Sammy Baugh, Bobby Layne, Doak Walker, Tom Landry, Bob Lilly, Don Meredith, Earl Campbell, Andre Ware, Mike Singletary, John David Crow, Lance Alworth, Dan Hampton, Steve Atwater, Joe Ferguson, and Eric Dickerson. The trio of kicking contemporaries Steve Little of Arkansas, Tony Franklin of Texas A&M, and Russell Erxleben of Texas all kicked record setting field goals of 60 + yards in the same season.

The early 1980s were the glory years of SWC basketball, including the Phi Slama Jama teams at the University of Houston. However, the most consistent program during the last quarter of the 20th century was the University of Arkansas with Sweet 16 appearances in 1978, 1979, 1981, 1983, 1990, 1991, Elite 8 appearances in 1978, 1979, 1990, and 1991, and Final Four appearances in 1978 and 1990. Arkansas's famed Triplets - Marvin Delph, Ron Brewer and Sidney Moncrief - gave the rest of the league fits. In the early 1990s, the Razorbacks' Lee Mayberry, Todd Day, and Oliver Miller won three straight SWC regular season and tournament titles from 1989 to 1991, the school's last three seasons in the conference.  The passion of Arkansas fans for their Razorbacks often overran the confines of SWC basketball venues, so much so, that Reunion Arena in Dallas (annual site of the SWC postseason tournament) was deemed "Barnhill South" (after the Razorbacks' on-campus arena) based on the numbers and intensity of Hog fans present.

Outstanding basketball coaches included Nolan Richardson, Tom Penders, Eddie Sutton, Abe Lemons, Guy V. Lewis, Shelby Metcalf, and Gerald Myers. Great SWC hoops players included the aforementioned Triplets, Hakeem Olajuwon, Clyde Drexler, Vinnie Johnson, Jon Koncak, Alvin Robertson, Ricky Pierce, Darrell Walker, Joe Kleine, Day, Mayberry, Miller, and U.S. Reed, among others.

The Texas Longhorns baseball program under coach Cliff Gustafson won national titles in 1975 and 1983, as well as titles under Bibb Falk in 1949 and 1950. The Arkansas Razorbacks also fielded fine teams that advanced to the College World Series. The Hogs finished 2nd in 1979, 3rd in 1985, and 5th in both the 1987 and 1989 seasons. The Hogs have continued this tradition since moving to the SEC, reaching the CWS four times under Arkansas alumnus Dave Van Horn, and were the 2018 national runners-up. Texas A&M rose to power in the late 1980s, going 58–5 in 1989 before losing twice in the regional championship round on its home field to LSU. The Aggies reached the College World Series in 1993. Rice began its ascent to college baseball's elite in the conference's final years under coach Wayne Graham, reaching the CWS in 1997, the year after the conference disbanded.

The Arkansas Razorbacks were dominant in track and field winning 15 SWC cross country team titles, 11 SWC indoor track team titles, 9 SWC outdoor track team titles, and an incredible 8 SWC triple crowns (cross country, indoor track and outdoor track champions all in the same season). During their SWC days, the Razorbacks won 14 NCAA national team championships and one NCAA team triple crown. The list of Arkansas individual SWC champions and individual NCAA champions is long. Standout coaches and athletes include the legendary John McDonnell of Arkansas, the winningest coach in NCAA history regardless of sport. Baylor's Michael Johnson, Texas A&M's Randy Matson, Rice's Fred Hansen, Houston's Carl Lewis, and Arkansas' Mike Conley all went on to win Olympic gold medals.

Final years

The 1980s saw many of the conference's athletic programs hit by recruiting scandals and NCAA probations.  The only programs to escape probation in the 1980s were Arkansas, Baylor, and Rice. Because of repeated major violations, in 1987, the SMU Mustangs football program became only the third in NCAA history to receive the so-called "death penalty" (after Kentucky basketball in 1952–53 and Southwestern Louisiana basketball from 1973 to 1975). The NCAA canceled SMU's 1987 season, and limited it to seven road games for 1988. However, nearly all of the school's lettermen transferred elsewhere, forcing SMU to keep its football program shuttered for 1988 as well. SMU also remained on probation until 1990. At that time, NCAA rules prohibited schools on probation from appearing on live television. As a result, the conference's market share in television coverage dwindled.

The SWC's performance in football declined precipitously. The last SWC football champion to win a bowl game was Texas A&M, who beat Notre Dame in the 1988 Cotton Bowl Classic by a score of 35–10. Since then, the final eight SWC champions lost in their bowl games. After SMU's second-place finish in most polls in 1982, SWC programs usually were not serious contenders for the national title. For instance: Texas had strong teams in 1981, 1983, 1990, and 1995. Arkansas earned national recognition in 1988 and 1989, and Texas A&M was competitive from 1985 to 1995.

However, by the end of their respective seasons, none of these football teams were able to remain in the national championship hunt.

The last days of the College Football Association
On June 27, 1984, the U.S. Supreme Court ruled in NCAA v. Board of Regents of the University of Oklahoma that the NCAA could not punish its membership for selling their media content. As a result, individual schools and athletic conferences were freed to negotiate contracts on their own behalf.

The Big Ten and Pacific-10 conferences sold their rights to CBS and ABC. Most of the rest of the Division I-A football programs (what is now called the Division I Football Bowl Subdivision) chose to sell their rights together through an organization called the College Football Association to ABC and CBS. The primary function of the CFA was to negotiate television broadcast rights for its member conferences and independent colleges.

By 1990, the television landscape had changed and a number of the stronger programs saw opportunities for better deals outside of the CFA. This was spearheaded by Notre Dame, who left the CFA and sold their home game broadcast rights to NBC in time for the 1991 season.

When the Southeastern Conference (SEC) invited the University of Arkansas and the University of South Carolina to join the conference in 1990, it created shockwaves across the CFA. The other conferences in the CFA correctly assumed the SEC made these additions to create a better TV product with the idea of leaving the CFA.

The SEC represented one of the more valuable assets in the CFA. It seemed likely if the SEC departed, the other conferences could have quite a difficult time securing good TV deals.

In February 1994, the Southeastern Conference announced that they would be leaving the CFA and negotiate independently for a television deal that covered SEC schools only. This led The Dallas Morning News to proclaim that "the College Football Association as a television entity is dead". In 1995, the SEC and the Big East broke from the CFA, signing a national deal with CBS. The SEC would earn a then-staggering $95 million from the deal. More significantly, this change in television contracts ultimately would lead to significant realignment of college conferences, with the SWC's demise triggering the first major realignment. (After the SWC's demise, another major realignment took place in the mid-2000s, with an even more dramatic realignment in the early 2010s and a third one now ongoing.)

In 1990, Arkansas announced its departure for the Southeastern Conference, marking the beginning of the end for the Southwest Conference. In March 1994, Texas, Texas A&M, Baylor, and Texas Tech accepted invitations to join with the members of the Big Eight Conference to form the Big 12 Conference. Soon afterward, SMU, TCU, and Rice accepted invitations to join the Western Athletic Conference, while Houston became a charter member of Conference USA. The Bayou Bucket game between Houston and Rice was the last football game played in the conference. In May 1996, after the completion of championship matches in baseball and track & field, the Southwest Conference was officially dissolved.

Legacy 
Over the course of its 82-year history, teams of the Southwest Conference garnered 64 recognized national championships in collegiate sports.

In 1997, the official records of the conference from 1914 to 1996 were moved from Dallas to the campus of Texas Tech University, becoming part of the Southwest Collection/Special Collections Library. The archive also contains an extensive assortment of images and memorabilia from each member university.

Members

Arkansas (1915–1991)
Baylor (1915–1996)
Houston (1972–1996)
Oklahoma (1915–1919)
Oklahoma A&M (1915–1925)
Phillips (1920)
Rice (1915–1917; provisional, 1918–1996)
SMU (1918–1996)
Southwestern (1915–1916)
Texas (1915–1996)
Texas A&M (1915–1996)
TCU (1923–1996)
Texas Tech (1956–1996)

Note:  Houston was invited to join the SWC in March 1971, and began play in all sports except football and basketball in 1972–73. Cougar basketball joined the fray in 1975–76, and football was last to join for the 1976–77 school year.

Membership timeline

Subsequent conference affiliations

Pre-1991

1991–1996 

 Oklahoma and Oklahoma A&M (Oklahoma State) left for the Missouri Valley. Oklahoma then joined the Big 6 which became the Big 7 when Colorado joined in 1947. The conference became the Big 8 with Oklahoma A&M's arrival. They then joined the Big 12 when Baylor, Texas, Texas A&M, and Texas Tech joined with the other former Big Eight Conference members. Oklahoma is set to leave the Big 12 for the Southeastern Conference (SEC) in 2024.
 TCU went to the WAC, later joined C-USA, then joined the Mountain West Conference (MWC). In December 2010, TCU announced it would join the Big East Conference on July 1, 2012. Then in October 2011, TCU instead accepted an invitation to the Big 12 Conference. Texas is set to leave the Big 12 for the SEC in 2024.
 Rice is set to leave C-USA for the AAC in 2023.
 Houston is set to leave the AAC for the Big 12 in 2023.

Sports

Football

Men's basketball

Baseball

Commissioners

 James W. St. Clair (1938–1945)
 James H. Stewart (1945–1950)
 Howard Grubbs (1950–1973)
 Cliff Speegle (1973–1982)
 Fred Jacoby (1982–1993)
 Steven J. Hatchell (1993–1995)
 Kyle Kallander (1995–1996)

Conference champions

Conference facilities
This is a listing of the conference facilities as of the 1995–96 school year, the conference's last. Capacities and venue names are also current for 1995–96.

See also
List of defunct college football conferences

References

Further reading

External links
 The Southwest Conference: Memorabilia, audio files, links
 A Look Back at the Southwest Conference
 Southwest Conference Records, 1914–1996 and undated, at the Southwest Collection/Special Collections Library
 Southwest Conference football helmets

 
Organizations based in Dallas
College sports in Texas
Sports in the Southern United States
1914 establishments in Texas
Sports organizations established in 1914
1996 disestablishments in Texas
Organizations disestablished in 1996
Articles which contain graphical timelines